The Book of Ceremonial Magic by Arthur Edward Waite was originally called The Book of Black Magic and of Pacts.  It was first published in a limited run in 1898, and distributed more widely under the title The Book of Ceremonial Magic in 1910.  It is an attempt to document various famous grimoires, explain the history behind them (refuting many of the legends surrounding them), discuss the theology contained therein (e.g. raising the question why good angels would be summoned to kill an enemy), and to synthesize many famous grimoires into one system.

References

External links
 Text of The Book of Ceremonial Magic at the Internet Sacred Text Archive

1911 non-fiction books
Occult books